Hardwired: The Sourcebook is a supplement published by R. Talsorian Games in 1989 for the dystopian near-future science fiction role-playing game Cyberpunk.

Contents
This supplement is set in the year 2151 using the background of the Walter Jon Williams novel Hardwired. The Earth has become a dystopian world where most heavy industry and the social elite are in orbit, the Orbital Corporations control the world, and the United States has balkanized into a myriad of regions. Smugglers exist at the fringes of society, using neural implants to increase their chances of survival while they look for an opportunity to permanently move into orbit. 

This supplement provides 
a background of the world 
a slang lexicon
new character classes, including pirate, private investigator, and new variants for cops and netrunners. 
rules for cyberpyschosis
19 new skills
new technology
various world currencies and benchmark prices
drugs that enhance neural implants
an alternate combat system
an alternate netrunning system
several adventure hooks

Six linked scenarios are included.

Publication history
In 1986, Walter Jon Williams joined the growing cyberpunk subgenre of science fiction with his novel Hardwired. Two years later, Williams helped Mike Pondsmith of R. Talsorian Games to playtest a new role-playing game, Cyberpunk. In 1989, Williams wrote Hardwired: The Sourcebook, a Cyberpunk supplement based on his novel with contributions by Mike Pondsmith and Pati Nagle. The 94-page softcover book features interior art by Matthew Anacleto, Harrison Fong, Sam Liu, Karl Martin, and T. K. Scott, and cover art by Luis Royo.

Reception
In the October–November 1989 edition of Space Gamer (Vol. II No. 2), the  reviewer commented that "If you're a Hardwired fan, this book is definitely worthwhile; it's a good springboard into Hardwired role-playing. And even for those who don't wish to use Williams' universe, the book is a good resource and idea bin. The rules, charts and background are sure to improve your Cyberpunk game." 

In the February 1990 edition of Dragon (Issue #154), Ken Rolston commented that this supplement "is true to the novel's tone and style [...] all to good effect." He concluded with a recommendation, saying, "A compelling and expressive evocation of a cyberpunk campaign setting, Hardwired is good reading, and the adventures are first class."

Other reviews
White Wolf #21 (June/July, 1990)

References

Cyberpunk (role-playing game) supplements
Role-playing game supplements introduced in 1989